Big Creek is a stream in Harrison and Daviess counties of northern Missouri. It is a tributary of the Grand River.

Big Creek most likely was named for its tendency to flood the adjacent fields following heavy rainstorms.

See also
List of rivers of Missouri

References

Rivers of Daviess County, Missouri
Rivers of Harrison County, Missouri
Rivers of Missouri